"Do or Die" is a single by Grace Jones, released in 1978, promoting her album Fame.

Background
"Do or Die" was the first and in most parts of the world the only single release from Jones' Fame, her second disco album. On Fame it made up the first part of the A-side non-stop medley "Do or Die"/"Pride"/"Fame". The 7" single featured a heavily edited version (3:22) with the French-language non-album track "Comme un oiseau qui s'envole" as the B-side, included as a bonus track on the Canadian edition of the Fame album. The 12" single featured a slightly shorter mix of the album version with a cold end, and the B-side an extended mix of "Comme un oiseau qui s'envole". "Do or Die" reached number 3 on the US Billboard dance chart.

In 1985 the 7" edit of "Do or Die" was included as one of three disco tracks on the career retrospective Island Life, the other being the album versions of "I Need a Man" and "La Vie en rose" (1977).

Music video
A music video was shot as a part of an Italian TV show Stryx, for which Jones made several more clips. It uses the Stryx studio set and sees Jones dancing with a surreal scenography in the background.

Track listing
7" single
A. "Do or Die" – 3:22
B. "Comme un oiseau qui s'envole" – 3:10

12" single
A. "Do or Die" – 6:15
B. "Comme un oiseau qui s'envole" – 4:30

Chart performance

Cover versions
Eartha Kitt recorded a cover of the song for her 1989 album I'm Still Here.

References

1978 singles
Eartha Kitt songs
Grace Jones songs
Songs written by Jack Robinson (songwriter)
1978 songs
Island Records singles